The Wolves of Willoughby Chase is a children's novel by Joan Aiken, first published in 1962. Set in an alternative history of England, it tells of the adventures of cousins Bonnie and Sylvia and their friend Simon the goose-boy as they thwart the evil schemes of their governess Miss Slighcarp, and their so-called "teacher" at boarding school, Mrs. Brisket.

The novel is the first in the Wolves Chronicles, a series of books set during the fictional early 19th-century reign of King James the Third. A large number of wolves have migrated from the bitter cold of Europe and Russia into Britain via a new "channel tunnel", and terrorise the inhabitants of rural areas. Aiken wrote the book over a period of years, with a seven-year gap due to her full-time work; the success of this, her second novel, enabled her to quit her job and write full-time.

It is described by John Rowe Townsend as "a tale of double-dyed villainy, with right triumphant in the end".

It was adapted into a film, with the same title, in 1989.

Plot
The story is set at Willoughby Chase, the grand home of Sir Willoughby and Lady Green and their daughter Bonnie.

Due to Lady Green's ill health, Bonnie's parents are taking a holiday in warmer climates touring the Mediterranean by ship, leaving her in the care of a newly arrived distant fourth cousin, Letitia Slighcarp. Also, due to arrive is Bonnie's orphan cousin Sylvia, who lived in London with Sir Willoughby's impoverished but genteel older sister Jane, coming to keep her cousin company in her parents' absence. Sylvia is nervous about the long train ride into the snowy countryside, especially when wolves menace the stopped train, but once she arrives, the cousins become instant friends. The robust and adventurous Bonnie is eager to show Sylvia the delights of country life, and they embark on an ice-skating expedition almost immediately. Although the adventure ends on a scary note—the girls are chased by the ever-present wolves—all is well thanks to Simon, a resourceful boy who lives on his own in a cave, raising geese and bees.

The girls soon learn that the blissful existence they anticipate together is not to last. With the help of Mr. Grimshaw, a mysterious man from the train, Miss Slighcarp takes over the household, dismissing all but the most untrustworthy household servants, threatening to arrest those who defy her, wearing Lady Green's gowns and tampering with Sir Willoughby's legal papers. This is the cause for Bonnie to continuously lose her temper. Bonnie and Sylvia also overhear ominous hints about their parents' ship, which has sunk, perhaps intentionally. Bonnie and Sylvia are not without allies: James, the clever footman, who spies on Miss Slighcarp for the girls; Pattern, Bonnie's loving and beloved maid; and the woodcrafty Simon. With their friends, the girls plan to alert the kindly and sensible local doctor to the crimes of Miss Slighcarp and Mr. Grimshaw, but Miss Slighcarp foils the scheme and sends them to a nearby industrial town, to a dismal and horrid orphanage run by the even more horrid Mrs. Brisket and her pretentious, spoiled, unscrupulous and abusive daughter, Diana.

Sylvia quickly weakens and grows ill due to the backbreaking work, frigid rooms, inadequate clothing, and scant meals; the stronger Bonnie realizes they must escape soon. She encounters the faithful Simon, in town to sell his geese and they plot an escape, thanks to some ragged clothes provided in secret by Pattern and a key that Simon copies. Even though it is the dead of winter, the girls are warmer and better fed in Simon's goose-cart than in the dreadful orphanage/workhouse. After Sylvia recovers, the trio embarks on a two-month journey to Aunt Jane in London.

On their arrival, they discover that Aunt Jane is near death from poverty-induced starvation, but with the help of a kind and idiosyncratic doctor downstairs, they nurse her back to health. They also catch Mr. Grimshaw sneaking into the lodging house that night. Confronted by the police and the family's lawyer, Mr. Grimshaw confesses the entire plot, and the girls return to Willoughby Chase, escorted by lawyer Gripe and Bow Street constables. At the mansion, they trick Miss Slighcarp and Mrs. Brisket into revealing their villainy while Mr. Grimshaw and the constables are secretly listening in, and Mrs. Brisket and Miss Slighcarp are arrested. At this moment, Bonnie's parents return, having survived the sinking ship; months in the sunny climate of the Canary Islands have restored Lady Green to health, and Sir Willoughby immediately begins setting Miss Slighcarp's depredations to rights. Bonnie's parents adopt Sylvia and agree to set up a school for Mrs. Brisket's charges and the now-humbled Diana, with a post for Aunt Jane, who had been too proud to accept charity.

Characters

Bonnie Green:
She is adventurous and confident. She has a silly temper, seen, for instance, when she sees Miss Slighcarp wearing her mother's  favourite dress and lashes out, telling her to take off the dress immediately.  She is somewhat spoiled, but a bright and cheerful girl. She is small but strongly built and full of energy, which makes her more resilient to the harshness of Mrs. Brisket's orphanage. She is nice and is courageous.

Sylvia Green:
Sylvia is quieter and more polite and ladylike than her cousin, but she likes to have fun and is a skilled needleworker. For her, everything at Willoughby Chase is extravagant and royal. Despite her sheltered life, she is eager to share Bonnie's adventures.
She has fair blond hair and is very delicate, both of build and constitution, so her health fails under the harshness of Mrs Brisket's orphanage.

Aunt Jane Green:
She is aunt to Bonnie and Sylvia and sister to Sir Willoughby Green. She is a good-natured, if somewhat strict and proud woman. Left on her own, she nearly starves herself to death because she is too proud to seek assistance. Once recovered, she sets up a proper school for Mrs Brisket's orphans and takes a firm hand in reforming Diana Brisket.

Miss Letitia Slighcarp:
She is a vain, menacing tyrant and a greedy con-artist. She seems to genuinely enjoy punishing the girls, especially the feisty Bonnie. She is tall, with bony features and is set on having Sir Willoughby's fortune.Mrs. Gertrude Brisket:She is a large, lazy woman with yellow eyes who owns the orphanage to which Bonnie and Sylvia are sent. Although opposite to Miss Slighcarp in appearance, she shares a prideful, domineering nature. She is primarily interested in money, and runs the orphanage as a work house, only having the girls do academic lessons when representatives from the Board of Orphans are on the premises.Diana Brisket:She is Mrs Brisket's vindictive, spoiled, and vain teenage daughter.  She loves being the centre of attention and having power over other people, and she does not obey her mother. She is humbled by her mother's downfall and reforms under Aunt Jane's guidance.Josiah Grimshaw:He was dismissed from Gripe's office for forgery; he uses this talent to provide fake credentials for Miss Slighcarp and alter Sir Willoughby's will giving her full power over Willoughby Chase.Mr. Gripe:He is the family lawyer and a kind-hearted man, who had been an unwitting dupe in the conspiracy to steal Sir Willoughby's estate.Mrs. Moleskin:She is the cook at Mrs Brisket's orphanage. She is a tartar and hits the orphans with whatever comes to hand. Her kitchen is filthy, and her gravy (which Bonnie throws in her face) is rancid.Pattern:She is Bonnie's kind-hearted maid. She stays in the house after all the other staff are dismissed, just to make sure the girls stay safe, and she assists Simon and James in the two girls' escape from the orphanage.James:He is the good-natured footman at Willoughby Chase. He contrives to stay on after the other staff are dismissed so he can help to protect the girls from Miss Slighcarp. He assists Simon and Pattern in the girls' escape from the orphanage, and then the police in the arrest of Miss Slighcarp and Mrs. Brisket.Simon:He is a boy not much older than Bonnie and Sylvia, who ran away from a cruel farmer and lives in the caves of Willoughby Chase and keeps geese and bees. He is kind and hard-working, deferential to Bonnie, and protective of her. He rescues Bonnie and Sylvia from wolves early in the book and helps them escape from the orphanage. He wears furs and has a warm voice. He is also a natural artist and uses his skills to earn money on their trip to London.Lucy:She is the first inmate who Sylvia and Bonnie meet at Mrs Brisket's orphanage, and together with Emma she becomes one of their closest friends.Emma:She is ordered to mentor Sylvia's work in the laundry at Mrs Brisket's orphanage and becomes one of Sylvia and Bonnie's closest friends.Alice:She is one of the worst-natured inmates of Mrs Brisket's orphanage, notorious for her tale-telling against the other girls; Mrs Brisket rewards tale-telling with a piece of cheese.Dr. Gabriel Field:He takes charge in nursing Aunt Jane back to health and alerts the authorities about the conspirators. He also encourages Simon in art workMr. Friendshipp:He is the inspector of the orphanage but lacks the perception to make a competent inspector. He is easily fooled into believing Mrs Brisket's orphanage is well-run, despite the freezing classrooms, the orphans' inadequate clothing, and their emaciation.Sir Willoughby:'He is the owner of Willoughby Chase, father to Bonnie and younger brother to Aunt Jane. He is very wealthy.

Film adaptation

The 1989 film version was directed by Stuart Orme with a screenplay by William M. Akers. The cast includes Stephanie Beacham as Miss Slighcarp, Mel Smith as Mr. Grimshaw, Geraldine James as Mrs. Brisket, Richard O'Brien as James, and Jane Horrocks as Pattern. Newcomers Emily Hudson and Aleks Darowska played Bonnie and Sylvia.  Although this adaptation is quite faithful to the novel, some characters are omitted (such as Dr. Gabriel Field), others are altered (Mrs. Brisket's daughter Diana is changed into a teenage son named Rupert, who serves as his mother's second-in-command) and the entire final act of the story features considerable changes.

Radio adaptation
On 30 December 1994, BBC Radio 4 broadcast an adaptation of the novel by Eric Pringle directed by Cherry Cookson, with Jane Lapotaire as Mrs. Slighcarp, John Rowe as the Narrator, Emily Watson as Sylvia, Abigail Docherty as Bonnie and Gavin Muir as Sir Willoughby.

Stage adaptation
The book was successfully adapted into a stage play by Russ Tunney for The Nuffield Theatre, Southampton and Forest Forge Theatre Company. Performed by a cast of five with original music, the show completed a National Tour in 2009/10.

It was praised in The Stage : "Wonderful stuff – worth wrapping up warm and turning out on a freezing night for."

The play was performed at the Edinburgh Fringe Festival 2011 by Not Cricket Productions, then also again in 2015 by Eagle House.

The amateur premiere of Tunney's adaptation was presented in January 2014 by Progress Theatre of Reading, Berkshire, UK.

In May 2015 a new adaptation of The Wolves of Willoughby Chase'' by playwright Peta Duncombe of PYP Scripts was staged by ACTion Community Theatre at the Terry O'Toole Theatre in Lincolnshire.

References

External links

1962 British novels
British alternative history novels
English novels
Novels by Joan Aiken
Children's historical novels
British novels adapted into films
Novels about orphans
Novels set in the 19th century
Jonathan Cape books
Novels set in England
1962 children's books
British children's novels